Anthony Charles "Tony" Wakeford (born 2 May 1959) is an English musician. Wakeford is a member of the left-wing and anti-fascist punk rock band Crisis, a co-founder of the band Death in June and founder of the neofolk band Sol Invictus.

Biography

Early work
Wakeford was the bassist for the English punk rock band Crisis. An openly left-wing and anti-fascist band, Crisis performed at events organized by Rock Against Racism and the Anti-Nazi League. Crisis disbanded in 1980, but Wakeford later began touring with a new line-up of the band in 2017. Wakeford, Crisis guitarist Douglas Pearce and Patrick Leagas co-founded the band Death in June. In early 1984, Wakeford was fired from Death in June for "bringing his 'right-wing leanings into the group'"; at the time he had been a member of the National Front (UK). Wakeford had also been a member of the Odinic Rite, a neopagan organization. After being fired from Death in June, Wakeford formed the post-punk band Above the Ruins, and in October 1984, they released a nine song demo album on cassette, Songs of the Wolf, which was distributed through the London-based P.O. box BCM Grimnir, and from the National Front bookshop in Croydon. The band's lyrics denounced communism, capitalism and liberalism. The demo received a favorable review from Nationalism Today, the journal of the National Front. The following year, Above the Ruins contributed the song "The Killing Zone" to the No Surrender compilation, and in late 1985, announced that their demo would be "soon to be available on record". In 1987, Wakeford distanced himself from right-wing views, and formed Sol Invictus. Years afterward, Wakeford denied ever having been a member of the National Front or Above the Ruins, but later admitted to having been a member of both.

Sol Invictus

In 1987, Wakeford formed the neofolk band Sol Invictus, adapting the band's name from a cult that predated Christianity. The band's music combines acoustic guitar playing and "neo-classical instrumentation" with elements of industrial music. Due to Wakeford's past political associations, Sol Invictus has been accused of neo-fascism. In 1990, Wakeford formed his own record label, Tursa. With distribution by World Serpent Distribution, Tursa released numerous albums by Sol Invictus, starting with Trees in Winter. After World Serpent dissolved in the 2000s, Cold Spring began distributing the band's albums.

Discography

References

External links
Tursa Records, Wakeford's label
Tursa Records on My Space

1959 births
Living people
People from Woking
English punk rock bass guitarists
English rock bass guitarists
Male bass guitarists
English modern pagans
Adherents of Germanic neopaganism
Performers of modern pagan music
Death in June members
Sol Invictus (band) members